This is a comparison of the Office Open XML document file format with the OpenDocument file format.

Comparison

See also
 Comparison of document-markup languages
 Standardization of Office Open XML
 List of document markup languages
 Lightweight markup language

References

External links
 ECMA-376 Office Open XML File Formats
 ISO/IEC IS 29500:2008 Office Open XML
 ISO/IEC IS 26300:2006 OpenDocument
 Lost in Translation: Interoperability Issues for Open Standards - ODF and OOXML as Examples

Office Open XML
OpenDocument
Markup language comparisons